Maharaja Nabakrishna Deb (also known as Raja  Nabakrishna Deb, archaic spelling Nubkissen; 10 October 1733 – 22 December 1797), founder of the Shovabazar Raj family, was a prominent zamindar and close confidant and friend of Robert Clive. He was the key figure in the liberation of Bengal from occupation of Siraj ud Dullah.

Gallery

See also
 Shobhabazar
 Shobhabazar Rajbari
 Hatuganj M.N.k. High School

References

Sources
Samsad Bengali Charitabhidhan (Vol.1) ( Biographical Dictionary) ed. Anjali Bose.  

People from Kolkata
Hindu revivalists
1733 births
1797 deaths
Bengali Hindus
Bengali zamindars
Indian philanthropists
18th-century philanthropists
18th-century Bengalis